The 2016 season was the 87th season of competitive baseball in the United Kingdom.

The season began on 3 April 2016 with the opening game of the National Baseball League with all other British Baseball Federation leagues set to begin on 10 April 2016.

BBF Affiliated Leagues

National Baseball League

National Baseball Championship

All results are up to date through the end of the season

AAA

AAA National Championships

All results are up to date through the end of the season

AA

Central

South Pool A

South Pool B

All results are up to date through the end of the season

A

Pool A

Pool B

Pool C

Pool D

All results are up to date as of 18 April 2016

Northern Conference

East

Central

West

All results are up to date as of 18 April 2016

Non-BBF Affiliated Leagues

South West Baseball League

Division 1

Division 2

All results are up to date through the end of the season

Baseball Scotland League

All results are up to date as of 27 April 2016

See also
British Baseball Hall of Fame
Baseball awards#United Kingdom
Baseball awards#Europe
Baseball in the United Kingdom

References

Baseball in the United Kingdom
Baseball
British
baseball
Baseball competitions in the United Kingdom